The Voice of a Woman (VOW) is an organization founded by Maureen A. Bryan in 2009, as a platform for the works of women filmmakers, artists and thought leaders internationally. The Voice of a Woman Festival, Awards, Talks and Masterclasses are presented each year in London, New York and Cannes.

History
Maureen A. Bryan, founder and chief executive officer of The Voice of a Woman (VOW), earned a Master's degree in directing from The Actors Studio in New York (1994) and worked in theatre, film, television and communications, as well as developing programs for youth in communities of greatest need internationally, before establishing VOW as a platform not only to feature the creative work of women in the arts but also "to help build a greater awareness of social justice, civil and human rights issues globally".

Originally based in London, UK, VOW hosted a launch event at the National Portrait Gallery in 2012, and has subsequently curated programs of talks and film screenings, as well as photographic exhibitions in collaboration with Getty Images, the Associated Press and Amnesty International.

Since 2016 VOW has also held an annual film festival in New York City.

In November 2018, the Voice of a Woman Festival, sponsored by Miu Miu, HBO and Kodak, was held at the Museum of Modern Art (MoMA) in New York, featuring the work of film directors, photographers, artists, actors and filmmakers such as Agnès Varda, Ava DuVernay, So Yong Kim, Crystal Moselle, Zoe Cassavetes, Chloë Sevigny, Naomi Kawase, Haifaa Al Mansour, Dakota Fanning, Hiam Abbass, Miranda July, Massy Tadjedin, Giada Colagrande, Lucrecia Martel, Alice Rohrwacher, Ming Smith, Lynn Hershman Leeson, and Adepero Oduye.

The Voice of a Woman Awards

The VOW Awards were first presented in 2012 and recipients in the UK, US and France have included: Scilla Elworthy, Nicola Benedetti, Zoë Wanamaker, Thandiwe Newton, Camilla Beeput, Sylvia Syms, Esther Anderson, Alison Owen, Kim Longinotto, Darnell Martin, Alison Owen, Sarah Gavron, Shola Lynch, Kamala Lopez, Patricia Arquette, Shirin Neshat, Grace Jones, Deeyah Khan, Sarah Gavron, and others.

Since 2017 VOW has presented the work of women directors of commercials at the Cannes Festival d'Palais during the Cannes Lions International Festival of Creativity, screening a selection of the best short films – commercials, branded content, dramas, documentaries, and art/experimental films – created by women internationally.

VOW talks
As part of an international travelling series VOW has featured live talk events, with such visionary women as Nina Menkes, Thandie Newton, Naomie Harris, Shirin Neshat, Deeyah Khan, Kim Longinotto, Sarah Gavron, Germaine Greer, Darnell Martin, Sylvia Syms, Zoe Wanamaker, Grace Jones and Dr. Scilla Elworthy PhD .

Youth projects
VOW also engages in Youth Leadership & Social Responsibility Projects (YLSR Projects) that deliver mentoring and training internationally, "using the power of film to educate and build awareness". Among VOW's partners have been UNICEF, UN WOMEN, Amnesty International and other NGOs, working with educational institutions and communities in South Africa, Tanzania, Uganda, Jamaica, UK and the US.

References

External links
 Official website

Recurring events established in 2009
Women's events
Women's festivals